Anastasia (Tasso) Kavadia (10 January 1921 – 18 December 2010) was a Greek film and television actress.

Biography
Kavadia was born on 10 January 1921 in Patras. She studied piano in Athens, writing and decoration in Paris, scenario and clothing with Giannis Tsarouchis, and acting at the Drama School at the Art School with Karolos Koun. She became commonly associated with roles of strict and bad-tempered women, mothers-in-law, etc.

From 1954 until 1967, Kavadia worked as a radio journalist and radio executive. From 1955 until 1969, she was a newspaper reporter.

Kavadia died on 18 December 2010 in Athens and was buried in the First Cemetery of Athens.

Filmography

Television

External links

1921 births
2010 deaths
Greek stage actresses
Greek film actresses
Actors from Patras
Burials at the First Cemetery of Athens